David Khanjyan (Khanjian) (July 30, 1940 - February 1981) was a Soviet Armenian conductor and pianist.

Khanjian was born in the family of Hakob Khanjian and Tatevik Sazandaryan. He finished the piano department of Yerevan State Conservatory, then entered to conduction department of the same conservatory. Then he studied Hans Swarowsky in the Vienna Music Academy. From 1974 to 1981 he was the Artistic Director and Principal Conductor of Armenian Philharmonic Orchestra.

External links
David Khanjian 
ՎԵՐՀԻՇԵԼՈՎ ԴԱՎԻԹ ԽԱՆՋՅԱՆԻՆ

Armenian musicians
Armenian pianists
Armenian music
1981 deaths
1940 births
20th-century pianists
20th-century conductors (music)